Seven minutes in heaven (or seven minutes in the closet) is a kissing party game mostly played at teenage parties. The game may also be played with a different duration.

The game
Two people are selected to go into a closet or other dark enclosed space and do whatever they like for seven minutes. It is common for the participants to kiss or make out, but they may instead choose to talk, engage in sexual activity, or simply do nothing at all and wait for the time to expire. 

The participants can be selected by various methods, such as spinning a bottle, drawing lots, or votes.

The game has been recorded as early as 1953.

In popular culture 
The game has been played or referenced in movies, such as Seven Minutes in Heaven (1985), Teen Wolf (1985), 13 Going on 30 (2004), Good Luck Chuck (2007), and Easy A (2010). TV or web series to feature the game include the Boy Meets World episode "Fear Strikes Out" (1994), the Family Guy episode "And the Wiener Is..." (2001), the King of the Hill episode "Get Your Freak Off" (2002), the Bernie Mac Show episode "The Talk" (2004), the Paris Hilton's My New BFF episode "You Gotta Have Class" (2008), the web series 7 Minutes in Heaven with Mike O'Brien (2011), season 5, episode 8 of The Big Bang Theory "The Isolation Permutation" (2011-2012), season 7, episode 18 of Modern Family "The Party" (2015–16), the Daredevil episode "Seven Minutes in Heaven" (2016), the Brooklyn Nine-Nine episode "Halloween IV" (2016), the Everything Sucks! episode "Romeo & Juliet in Space" (2018), the Uncle series 2 episode "Seven Minutes in Heaven" (2015) (set in Halloween), the Adventure Time episode "Slumber Party Panic" (2010), and the Little Fires Everywhere episode "Picture Perfect" (2020). In the horror-comedy The Babysitter: Killer Queen, the male and female leads play "2 Minutes in Heaven" with three other teenagers, the host claiming two minutes is "more realistic."

Musical references to the game include the Fall Out Boy song "7 Minutes in Heaven (Atavan Halen)" (2005) and in the Britney Spears song "Slumber Party" (2016).

Theatrical references to the game include the Steven Levenson play Seven Minutes in Heaven (2009).

References

Kissing games
Party games